Heaven on Earth is a British and Canadian dramatic television film, directed by Allan Kroeker and released in 1987. A coproduction of the BBC and CBC Television, the film centres on a group of orphaned children from the United Kingdom who are sent to Canada as Home Children in the 1910s.

The film's screenplay was written by Margaret Atwood and Peter Pearson. However, Atwood was critical of the finished product, as Kroeker and Nancy Botkin inserted a sexual assault scene she had not written and did not endorse as it did not fit her historical research into the Home Children.

The cast included Torquil Campbell, Sarah Polley, Fiona Reid, Sian Leisa Davies, Nathan Adamson, Amos Crawley, Huw Davies, Donna Edwards, David Hughes, Alison MacLeod, Loreena McKennitt, Maureen McRae, Nicholas Rice, Judy Sinclair, Cedric Smith and R.H. Thomson.

The film was broadcast on March 1, 1987, both as an episode of the anthology series Screen Two on the BBC and as a standalone television film on the CBC. In 1988 it was broadcast in the United States as an episode of Masterpiece Theatre, the first Canadian production ever anthologized by that series.

Thomson received a Gemini Award nomination for Best Actor in a Television Film or Miniseries at the 2nd Gemini Awards.

References

External links

1987 films
1987 television films
Canadian drama television films
English-language Canadian films
BBC Film films
Works by Margaret Atwood
1980s Canadian films
1980s British films
British drama television films